Señor Frog's (Mister Frog) is a Mexican-theme franchised bar and grill in tourist destinations throughout Mexico, the Caribbean, Tenerife, and the United States.

In Mexico and the western Caribbean, about 75% of its revenues come from alcoholic beverage sales. In Myrtle Beach, South Carolina, however, the company has been unable to promote drinking as successfully; food outsells liquor there by a slight margin.

History 
Señor Frog's is owned by Grupo Anderson's, founded in 1963, who claims their more than 50 restaurants makes it Mexico's largest restaurateur. In addition to Señor Frog's, Grupo Anderson's owns the Carlos'n Charlie's chain.

Locations 
There are currently Señor Frogs locations in:

 Panama City Beach, Florida
 Cabo San Lucas, Baja California Sur, Mexico
 Cancún, Quintana Roo, Mexico
 Costa Maya, Quintana Roo, Mexico
 Cozumel, Quintana Roo, Mexico
 Ayia Napa, Cyprus
 Freeport, The Bahamas
 Las Vegas, Nevada
 Nassau, The Bahamas
 Myrtle Beach, South Carolina
 Orlando, Florida
 Mazatlán, Sinaloa, Mexico
 Miami Beach, Florida
 Playa del Carmen, Quintana Roo, Mexico
 San Juan, Puerto Rico
 Puerto Vallarta, Jalisco, Mexico
 Tenerife, Canary Islands, Spain
 CHELAN, WASHINGTON

References

External links 

 

Restaurants in Mexico
Multinational restaurant chains 
Theme restaurants
Regional restaurant chains in the United States
Restaurants established in 1989
1989 establishments in Mexico